Ubiquinol-cytochrome c reductase complex chaperone CBP3 homolog is an enzyme that in humans is encoded by the UQCC gene.

References

Further reading